This is a list of all monitors of the United States Navy. While the most famous name is represented in this list, many monitors held multiple names during their service life. View the complete list of names.

Historical overview
The whole category of monitors took its name from the first of these, designed in 1861 by John Ericsson. They were low-freeboard, steam-powered ironclad vessels, with one or two rotating armored turrets, rather than the traditional broadside of guns. The low freeboard meant that these ships were unsuitable for ocean-going duties and were always at risk of swamping and possible loss, but it reduced the amount of armor required for protection.

They were succeeded by more seaworthy armored cruisers and battleships.

River monitors

Neosho-class monitors

 
 , sunk by mine, 29 March 1865, 2 killed

Marietta-class monitors

Harbor monitors

Casco-class monitors
[[File:Uss Shawnee 1865.jpg|thumb|right|Casco-class monitors Shawnee and Wassuc.]]

 
 
 
 
 
 
 
 
 
 
 
 
 
 
 
 
 
 
 
 

Coastal monitors

Monitor-class monitor
 , foundered 31 December 1862, 16 killed

Passaic-class monitors

 
 
 
 , sunk by mine on 15 January 1865, 75 killed
 , sunk at anchor, 6 December 1863, 31 killed
 
 
 
 
 

Canonicus-class monitors

 
 
 , sunk by mine, 5 August 1864, 94 killed
 
 
 
 
 , later BAP Atahualpa
 , later BAP Manco Cápac

Milwaukee-class monitors

 , sunk by mine, 28 March 1865, no fatalities
 
 
 

Seagoing monitors

 
 
 

Miantonomoh-class monitors

 
 
 
 

Kalamazoo-class monitors

 
 
 
 

"New Navy" monitors
The first five of these were ostensibly rebuilds of Civil War era monitors (in much the same way that the 1854 sloop-of-war Constellation was ostensibly a refit of the 1797 sail frigate Constellation). In fact, they were entirely new ships, much larger and more capable than the previous ones. Dates listed are the first commissioning dates.

Puritan-class monitors
 (BM-1) Puritan (1896) Spanish–American War

Amphitrite-class monitors

 (BM-2) Amphitrite (1895) Spanish–American War, WW1
 (BM-3) Monadnock  (1896) Spanish–American War, Boxer Rebellion, WW1
 (BM-4) Terror (1896) Spanish–American War
 (BM-5) Miantonomoh (1882) Spanish–American War

Monterey-class monitors
 (BM-6) Monterey (1893) Spanish–American War

Arkansas-class monitors

 (M-7/BM-7) Arkansas (1902) later Ozark, WW1
 (M-8/BM-8) Nevada (1903) ex-Connecticut, later Tonopah, WW1
 (M-9/BM-9) Florida (1903) later Tallahassee, WW1, later IX-16
 (M-10/BM-10) Wyoming (1902) Panama independence, later Cheyenne, WW1, later IX-4

USN "Brown Water Navy" (Vietnam War) Monitors

The US Navy created their first Mobile Riverine Force (MRF) for the first time since the American Civil War, during the Vietnam War. World War II all steel -long Landing Craft Mechanized (LCM-6s) were used as the basic hull to convert into 24 Monitors from 1966-1970. This was a separate US Navy  Mobile Riverine Force from the Swift Boats (PCFs) and PBRs already operating in country. The twenty-four river Monitors were divided into two groups: Program 4 & 5.  Ten Program 4 Monitors arrived first in Vietnam, and were armed with one 40mm cannon mounted inside a revolving Mk 52 turret; while the 8 later arriving Program 5 versions (designated Monitor "H") mounted one M49 105mm Howitzer inside a revolving T172 turret. Due to a shortage of M49 howitzers, the USN converted the remaining six Program 5 Monitors (designated Monitor "F") to Flamethrower Monitors, and equipped them with an M10-8 flamethrower mounted inside an M8 cupola turret.  The early Program 4 Monitors had hull numbers reflecting their River Assault Division'' (RAD) as well as their hull number.  Later, simply the hull numbers were used, such as M-1 (Monitor 1), A-1 (Alpha Boat 1), C-1 (Command/Communications/Control 1), etc.

River Assault Flotilla One Program 4 Monitors (40mm cannon)

RAD 91
M-91-1
M-91-2
M-91-3
Command Monitor (CCB-Command Communications Boat) C-91-1
RAD 92
M-92-1
M-92-2
C-92-1
RAD 111
M-111-1
M-111-2
M-111-3
C-111-1
RAD 112
M-112-1
M-112-2
C-112-1

River Assault Flotilla One Program 5 Monitors (105mm Howitzer) & (Flamethrower)

M-1, M-2, M-3, M-4, M-5, M-6, M-7, and M-8
Z-1 to Z-6.

Similar vessels of interest

 , an experimental ironclad steamer with composite armor and two armored three-gun towers, fought in one battle.
 , an innovative semi-submersible spar torpedo boat, effectively employed in the Civil War.
 , an ironclad harbor defense ram.
 Brown Water Navy monitors, small turreted gunboats that were part of the US military's brown water fleet during the Vietnam War.

References

External links
 navsource.org: Battleship Photo Index

Monitors
American Civil War monitors
Monitors list